Scotorythra diceraunia is a moth of the family Geometridae. It was first described by Edward Meyrick in 1900. It is endemic to the Hawaiian islands of Oahu, Molokai and Maui.

Larvae have been reared from guava.

External links

D
Endemic moths of Hawaii
Biota of Maui
Biota of Oahu